Goodenia elaiosoma is a species of flowering plant in the family Goodeniaceae and is endemic to the northern part of the Northern Territory. It is a low-lying annual herb with its new growth covered with white hairs, and has linear leaves, and racemes of purplish-brown flowers with cream to dark maroon tips.

Description

Taxonomy and naming
Goodenia elaiosoma was first formally described in 2005 by Ian D. Cowie in the journal  Austrobaileya from material he collected near Hope Inlet in 2000. The specific epithet (elaiosoma) is from Ancient Greek meaning "oil body", referring to the elasiosome on the seed.

Distribution and habitat
This goodenia grows in grassland, sedgeland or low open woodland from the Finniss River near Darwin to the Kakadu National Park in the northern parts of the Northern Territory.

References

elaiosoma
Flora of the Northern Territory
Plants described in 2005
Endemic flora of Australia